Juha-Matti Räsänen (born May 19, 1974) is a strongman competitor from Kuopio, Finland. Juha began training for strongman in 1995, began competing as an amateur in 1996 and turned professional in 2000. Juha competed in the 2001 and 2002 World's Strongest Man contests, finishing 9th and 6th respectively. Juha is a 2-time winner of Finland's Strongest Man in 2002 & 2003, and is a 3 time runner-up. Juha holds the Guinness World Record for throwing a 60 kg man 5.40 meters (17 ft 8in) in Spain in July 2006.  He was primarily known for his back strength, claiming a deadlift of 385 kg (849 lbs), and easily won that event in his heat of the 2001 World's Strongest Men competition.

References

Finnish strength athletes
Living people
1974 births
People from Kuopio
Sportspeople from North Savo